Sai Noi is one of the seven subdistricts (tambon) of Sai Noi District, in Nonthaburi Province, Thailand. Neighbouring subdistricts are (clockwise from north) Khlong Khwang, Lahan, Bang Bua Thong, Thawi Watthana and Khun Si. In 2020 it had a total population of 29,256 people.

Administration

Central administration
The subdistrict is subdivided into 11 administrative villages (muban).

Local administration
The area of the subdistrict is shared by two local administrative organizations.
Sai Noi Subdistrict Municipality
Sai Noi Subdistrict Administrative Organization

References

External links
Website of Sai Noi Subdistrict Municipality
Website of Sai Noi Subdistrict Administrative Organization

Tambon of Nonthaburi province
Populated places in Nonthaburi province